Sue Ennis is a songwriter from Seattle, Washington.  She has co-written over 80 songs with Ann Wilson and Nancy Wilson of the band Heart.

Career
Ennis' songwriting with Heart includes "Straight On", "Even It Up" and "Dog & Butterfly", and she has been a member of the band The Lovemongers with the Wilsons and Frank Cox.

She has co-written music as part of other works: With John Barry and Ann and Nancy Wilson, Ennis co-wrote "The Best Man in the World" from the 1986 film The Golden Child.  She has co-written songs with Hummie Mann, including "Shining Time" from the 2000 movie Thomas and the Magic Railroad. She wrote the song for "The Great Fire", a permanent installation in Seattle's Museum of History and Industry and wrote the score and songs for Art Dog a musical production at the Seattle Children's Theatre.

She teaches classes on songwriting and music business at Shoreline Community College near Seattle, Washington and has served four terms as Trustee of the Pacific Northwest Chapter of the Recording Academy. In 2021 she was named to the Leadership Council for the Songwriters and Composers Wing of the Recording Academy. In 2018, she was appointed to the Seattle Music Commission in the Office of Arts and Culture which oversees music advocacy for the PNW music community. (reappointment in 2021.) Three of her songs ("You and Me", "I'll Find You", "Walk Away") appear on You and Me (2021) the first solo record by Heart's Nancy Wilson. She has B.A. degrees in English and German from Willamette University and her M.A. in German Literature from the University of California, Berkeley.

References

Year of birth missing (living people)
Living people
American women songwriters
American rock songwriters
Heart (band)
Jingle writers
Songwriters from Washington (state)
Women music educators